WD 1145+017 (also known as EPIC 201563164) is a white dwarf approximately  from Earth in the constellation of Virgo. It is the first white dwarf to be observed with a transiting planetary-mass object orbiting it.

Stellar characteristics 
The white dwarf has a mass of 0.6 , radius of 0.02  (1.4 ) and a temperature of 15,020 K, typical for white dwarf stars. It has been a white dwarf for 224 million years. The star included strong absorption lines due to magnesium, aluminium, silicon, calcium, iron and nickel. These elements commonly found in rocky planets are polluting the surface of the star, and would normally be expected to mix through the star and disappear from view after a million years.

A circumstellar dust cloud and disk (likely due to disintegrating asteroids, located at 97 to 103 R_wd, and emitting thermal IR radiation) surrounds the star. In addition, a circumstellar gas disk (located ~ 25 to 40 R_wd, and undergoing relativistic precession with a period of ~ 5 years) surrounds the star as well.

Based on recent studies and calculations, it is believed that the star initially was an early A-type main sequence star with a mass of about 2.46 , remaining so for an estimated 550 million years. Afterwards, following the exhaustion of hydrogen within its core, it evolved and expanded into a red giant before eventually ejecting its layers and contracting into a white dwarf, and has gradually cooled over the last 224 million years. This gives the star an estimated total age of around 774 million years.

The apparent magnitude of the star, or how bright it appears from Earth's perspective, is about 17. Therefore, it is too dim to be seen with the naked eye.

Planetary system 

The supposed planetesimal, WD 1145+017 b, with a 4.5 hour orbit, is being ripped apart by the star and is a remnant of the former planetary system that the star hosted before becoming a white dwarf. It is the first observation of a planetary object being shredded by a white dwarf. Several other large pieces have been seen in orbit as well. All the various larger pieces have orbits of 4.5 to 4.9 hours. Rocky material is raining down onto the star, and showing up in the star's spectrum. The system was detected by the Kepler space telescope in its extended K2 mission. Though the system was not a target of interest, it was within the field of view of observing sessions, and analysis of the observed data revealed the system.

Supporting observational data, along with data from the Chandra X-ray Observatory, were also found related to dust debris orbiting WD 1145+017.

Similar systems 
In September 2020, astronomers reported the discovery, for the first time, of a very massive Jupiter-sized planet, named WD 1856 b, closely orbiting, every 36 hours, a tiny white dwarf star, named WD 1856+534, a left-over remnant of an earlier much larger sun-like star. This WD 1856 system is similar to the WD 1145+017 system.

See also 
 Disrupted planet
 List of stars that dim oddly
 ZTF J0139+5245

References

External links 
 EPIC Catalog at MAST
 Harvard Center for Astrophysics,  EPIC 201563164
 AstronomyNow, WD 1145+017
 AmericaSpace, WD 1145+017

White dwarfs
Virgo (constellation)
Hypothetical planetary systems